Lethem Airport  is an airport serving Lethem, a town in the Upper Takutu-Upper Essequibo region of Guyana.

Airlines and destinations

See also

 List of airports in Guyana
 Transport in Guyana

References

External links
 
Lethem Airport
OpenStreetMap - Lethem

Airports in Guyana
Upper Takutu-Upper Essequibo